The Buick Circus Hour is an American television series which aired from 1952 to 1953 on NBC. It was a variety series with a circus theme. It was a 60-minute show, 52 or so minutes minus ads. As the title suggests, it was sponsored by Buick. Archival status is not known, but the debut episode appears on the Internet Archive.

This series aired once a month at the Tuesday night 8:00 PM Eastern time slot normally occupied by the Texaco Star Theater which starred Milton Berle.

A reviewer for the Brooklyn Eagle newspaper felt the series was not up to 1952 standards (comparing the show with a 1948 variety show), though also describing the cast and crew as being talented.

References

External links

Video of The Buick Circus Hour at Internet Archive

1952 American television series debuts
1953 American television series endings
1950s American variety television series
Black-and-white American television shows
NBC original programming